Damned is a studio album by Swedish hardcore punk band Wolfbrigade which was released on 23 April 2012 via Southern Lord Records.

Reception

Damned was described by Natalie Zed in About.com as hardcore with a "distinctly metallic flavour", which provided "plenty of satisfying breakdowns and unrelenting aggression paired with beefy, muscular riffs [that] swing between dirty punk, classic hardcore and the odd bit of death metal." Pitchfork's Kim Kelly praised the album as "fast and deadly" and "another worthy addition to their rock-solid catalog". Both Zed and Kelly drew attention to the melodic nature of the band's more experimental track, "Ride the Steel".

Track listing

Personnel
Wolfbrigade
Micke Dahl - vocals
Erik Norberg - guitar
Jocke Rydbjer - guitar
Johan Erkenvåg - bass
Dadde Stark - drums

Production
Peter In De Betou - mastering
Fredrik Nordström - producer, recording, engineering
Henrik Udd - recording, engineering
Fabio "Fabbe" Persegani - cover art

References

2012 albums
Wolfbrigade albums
Southern Lord Records albums
Albums produced by Fredrik Nordström